The Daniel Dove Collins House is a historic house located at 621 W. Main St. in Collinsville, Illinois. Daniel Dove Collins built the house in 1845 for himself and his wife. Collins, a cousin of the founders of Collinsville, was the first president of the then-village's Board of Trustees, and he held board meetings in his house. The post-and-beam house was designed in the Greek Revival style. The house has five bays delineated by the six Doric columns supporting its front porch. It is a rare surviving example of a five-bay Greek Revival home in Illinois. In the late 1880s or early 1890s, the house was moved from its original site at Main and Center Streets to its current location.

The house was added to the National Register of Historic Places on November 21, 2002.

References

Houses on the National Register of Historic Places in Illinois
Greek Revival houses in Illinois
Houses completed in 1845
National Register of Historic Places in Madison County, Illinois
Houses in Madison County, Illinois